HKGolden50 is a small policy research organisation in Hong Kong. It claims to be "non-political, non-profit, independent" although its prime mover is Franklin Lam. a former member of the Executive Council of Hong Kong.  The group publishes research reports on perceived opportunities and bottlenecks in Hong Kong.  The research team consists of Lam and nine post-80s members.

History 
Lam, a former UBS property analyst and fund manager, founded the organisation in June 2011.

Activities 
Research findings have been published in the local print media, The team has been interviewed on local radio and its findings have been picked up by local television news.

HKGolden50 also disseminates its research findings through lectures and discussions at professional associations, governmental and non-governmental institutions, as well as community talks open to the general public.

Research 
HKGolden50 has published several reports:
 Hong Kong - The Golden 5 Years and the Decline that may follow...?
 How to become a World City: Lessons from London
 How to Invest $100bn for Our Future
 How to Create A World-Class Medical System

References

External links
 HKGolden50 website

Non-profit organisations based in Hong Kong
Political and economic think tanks based in Hong Kong
Think tanks established in 2011
2011 establishments in Hong Kong